The Bedroom Sessions by Faithless was released with the 123rd issue of Mixmag in August 2001.  It was compiled by Sister Bliss, Rollo Armstrong and Maxi Jazz of Faithless.

Track listing
 Nuyorican Soul - "Black Gold of the Sun" - 5:08
 Dillinger - "Cocaine In My Brain" (Groove Corporation Mix) - 5:53
 Wayne Smith - "Under Me Sleng Teng" - 3:45
 A Man Called Adam - "Estelle" - 6:17
 Cry Sisco! - "Afrodizziact" (Oakenfold's Raid Mix) - 5:47
 Bent - "Swollen" - 7:15
 Tom McRae - "You Cut Her Hair" - 2:24
 Jestofunk - "Can We Live" - 6:13
 Fallout - "Morning After" (Sunrise Mix) - 6:29
 Orr-Some - "We Can Make It" (Hardcore Remix) - 4:54
 M. J. Cole - "Sincere" - 5:36
 Nick Drake - "River Man" - 4:19

References
 Various  - The Bedroom Sessions @ Discogs.com
 Various Artists 'The Bedroom Sessions' @ Faithless Discography

Faithless albums
2001 compilation albums